Miranda Municipality may refer to:

 Miranda, Mato Grosso do Sul, Brazil
 Miranda, Cauca, Colombia

Venezuela
 Miranda Municipality, Carabobo
 Miranda Municipality, Falcón
 Miranda Municipality, Mérida
 Miranda Municipality, Trujillo
 Miranda Municipality, Zulia, in Zulia

See also
 Miranda (disambiguation)
 Francisco de Miranda Municipality (disambiguation)

Municipality name disambiguation pages